Baohe Wan is a greyish-brown, slightly sour and astringent pill used in Traditional Chinese medicine to "stimulate digestion, remove retained food and regulate the stomach function". It is used in cases where there is "retention of undigested food with epigastric and abdominal distension, foul belching, acid regurgitation and loss of appetite".

Chinese classic herbal formula

See also
 Chinese classic herbal formula
 Bu Zhong Yi Qi Wan

References

Traditional Chinese medicine pills